Terence Geoffrey Bly (22 October 1935 – 24 September 2009) was an English football striker.

Career
He was renowned for his goalscoring prowess, most notably for Norwich City and Peterborough United, scoring a record 54 goals in the latter's inaugural Football League season of 1960–61. He then played for Coventry City and Notts County before joining Grantham in October 1964.

Coaching career
Although he retired from playing in April 1970, he continued to manage Grantham Town until 1978.

Death
Bly died on 24 September 2009, as a result of a heart attack.

Notes

External links
Profile at UpThePosh! The Peterborough United Database
Profile at Grantham Town F.C. website

1935 births
2009 deaths
People from Bourne, Lincolnshire
Association football forwards
English footballers
English football managers
Bury Town F.C. players
Norwich City F.C. players
Peterborough United F.C. players
Coventry City F.C. players
Notts County F.C. players
Grantham Town F.C. players
Grantham Town F.C. managers